Canal Street is a yearly music festival in Arendal, Aust-Agder, Norway. 

The festival was first presented in 1996 as Arendal Jazz & Blues Festival, but in the later years it has grown to emphasize quality music of all genres.

History
The festival is known for its use of unusual venues, such as Jazz at the Lille Torungen Lighthouse,  Merdø Uthavn, Kolbjørnsvik and "Føling på fyllinga" at the local waste dump, Heftingsdalen.

Canal Street was for a long time one of few Norwegian festivals in which jazz and blues are the main genres, though rock and world music where performed as well.

Arendal was a town of canals. One of the remains from the canal era is Canal Place, for many years one of the main venues of the festival.

Canal Street was certified as a "green venue" in 2006 as one of the first festivals in Norway. Canal Street joined the UN's Carbon Neutral Network and supported Earth Hour 2009.

Guests

2008 
 Ane Brun
 Solomon Burke
 deLillos
 Dum Dum Boys
 Bill Evans
 Inger Marie Gundersen
 Rich Harper Blues Band
 Hilde Hefte
 Heroes & Zeros
 Sondre Lerche
 Krissy Matthews
 John Mayall & the Bluesbreakers
 Nils Petter Molvær
 Ole Paus
 Rangers
 The Waterboys
 Bugge Wesseltoft
 Bertine Zetlitz

2009
 Jonas Alaska
 Arild Andersen
 Dag Arnesen
 Randy Brecker
 CC Cowboys
 Bill Evans
 Kjetil Grande
 Bo Kaspers Orkester
 Katzenjammer
 Angélique Kidjo
 Kim Larsen
 Helge Lien
 Lillebjørn Nilsen
 Hallgeir Pedersen
 Satyricon
 Tommy Smith 
 Onkel Tuka
 Paolo Vinaccia

2010
 Frøy Aagre
 Mari Boine
 Richard Bona
 Jon Eberson
 Melody Gardot
 Gåte
 Thom Hell
 Sivert Høyem
 Jaga Jazzist
 Lars Lillo-Stenberg
 Ulf Lundell
 Veronica Maggio
 Ingrid Olava
 Ole Paus
 The Rosenberg Trio
 Terje Rypdal
 Esperanza Spalding

2011
 Jonas Alaska
 Paul Banks
 Jarle Bernhoft
 Stein Torleif Bjella
 Chili Vanilla
 Elin Furubotn
 Bob Geldof
 Beth Hart
 Kaizers Orchestra
 Hilde Marie Kjersem
 Audun Kleive
 Iver Kleive
 Madcon
 Silje Nergaard
 Pay-per-frog
 Violet Road
 Karl Seglem
 Susanna Wallumrød
 Bugge Wesseltoft

2012
 Admiral P
 Arild Andersen
 Ian Anderson
 Ketil Bjørnstad
 Kari Bremnes
 Canned Heat
 Christianssand String Swing Ensemble
 Dumdum Boys
 Gabrielle
 Get the Blessing
 Inger Marie Gundersen
 Veronica Maggio
 Tania Maria
 Elly Marvellous
 Raul Midon
 Nils Petter Molvær
 Randy Pavlock
 Bugge Wesseltoft

2022
 Aurora
 Madrugada
 Erlend Ropstad
 Bo Kaspers Orkester
 Sondre Lerche
 Jonas Alaska
 Sol Heilo
 Bjørn Eidsvåg
 Stein Torleif Bjella
 Fadnes
 Hannah Storm

References

External links
 

Arendal
Culture in Agder
Music festivals in Norway
Recurring events established in 1996
1996 establishments in Norway